A legal periodical is a periodical about law. Legal periodicals include legal newspapers, law reviews, periodicals published by way of commerce, periodicals published by practitioner bodies, and periodicals concerned with a particular branch of the law.

The obituaries and profiles in legal periodicals may be useful to historians and biographers. Book reviews in legal periodicals may be useful to librarians. There is a Book Review Index in the Index to Legal Periodicals.

References
Patrick Polden, "The Education of Lawyers" in W R Cornish, The Oxford History of the Laws of England, Oxford University Press, 2010, volume 11, pages 1201 to 1211.
Allyson Nancy May. The Bar and the Old Bailey, 1750–1850. University of North Carolina Press. 2003. Pages 135 and 136.
Frank Luther Mott. "Legal Periodicals". A History of American Magazines, 1865–1885. Belknap Press of Harvard University Press. 1938. Page 144.

Legal research